Greetings! We're The Monitors is the debut album by The Monitors, released in 1968. It is composed of material that the group recorded from the three-year span of 1965 to 1968. Richard Street, who would later replace Paul Williams in The Temptations, is the lead singer of this group. Shortly after the album was released, the Monitors disbanded and didn't get back together again until 1990, when the group released a reunion album entitled Grazing in the Grass.

Track listing 
"Bring Back the Love" (James Dean, William Weatherspoon, Brian Holland, Jack Alan Goga) - 2:56
"Share a Little Love With Me" (Ivy Jo Hunter, Curtis Colbert) - 2:26
"Step By Step (Hand in Hand)" (James Dean, William Weatherspoon) - 2:52
"The Further You Look, The Less You See" (William Robinson, Norman Whitfield) - 2:17
"Since I Lost You Girl" (Harvey Fuqua, Johnny Bristol) - 2:32
"Baby Make Your Own Sweet Music" (Sandy Linzer, Denny Randell) - 2:30
"Greetings (This Is Uncle Sam)" (P Bennet (sic The Valadiers credit)) - 2:54
"Time Is Passin' By" (James Dean, William Weatherspoon) - 2:43 
"Say You" (Robert Staunton, Robert Dobyne, Charles Jones) - 2:30
"Number One in Your Heart" (Clyde Wilson, Wilbur Jackson, Harvey Fuqua, Johnny Bristol) - 2:50
"Serve Yourself a Cup of Happiness" (James Dean, William Weatherspoon) - 2:19
"You Share the Blame" (William Robinson, Ronald White) - 2:47

References

1968 debut albums
Motown albums
The Monitors (American band) albums